RCHS can refer to many things:

Primary and secondary schools
Rock Canyon High School in Highlands Ranch, Colorado
Raleigh Charter High School in Raleigh, North Carolina
Rancho Cucamonga High School in Rancho Cucamonga, California
Rensselaer Central High School in Rensselaer, Indiana
Richland Collegiate High School in Dallas, Texas
Rochester Community High School in Rochester, Indiana
Rockdale County High School in Conyers, Georgia
Roman Catholic High School for Boys in Philadelphia, Pennsylvania
Rushville Consolidated High School in Rushville, Indiana
Rappahannock County High School in Washington, Virginia
Roselle Catholic High School in Roselle, New Jersey
Rancho Cotate High School in Rohnert Park, California
Ruleville Central High School (now Thomas E. Edwards, Sr. High School) in Ruleville, Mississippi
Reed-Custer High School in Braidwood, Illinois
Richmond Community High School in Richmond, Virginia 
Other:
Railway and Canal Historical Society, Great Britain's principal transport history society